WFSS (91.9 FM) is a public radio station in Fayetteville, North Carolina broadcasting National Public Radio programming originating from WUNC.  It was owned by Fayetteville State University until May 2015, when it was purchased by the University of North Carolina at Chapel Hill and turned into a WUNC satellite.

In its final years as a separately programmed station, WFSS programmed jazz as well as an eclectic mix of formats on the weekend, including bluegrass, Gospel, blues, African and Latin music. It serves Fayetteville and twelve surrounding counties.

History

In 1977, WFSS began broadcasting at 10 watts, and was operated by students using the station to prepare them for broadcasting careers. Its coverage area was limited to a two-mile radius of campus. In February 1983, power was increased to 100,000 watts, and the station joined NPR. From the beginning the station played jazz but went on to offer a wide variety of programming including blues, reggae and rhythm and blues. Joseph Ross, who came from Monrovia, Liberia, was the station manager from 1977 until the 1980s and again starting in 1995.

In March 1993, in order to switch from 89.1 to 91.9 and reduce interference to WECT in Wilmington (whose transmitter was located in Bladen County), WFSS signed off for five days and then came back at 30,000 watts before finally returning to full power at 100,000 watts.

On January 20, 2000, a winter storm caused significant damage to broadcasting equipment, and WFSS came back days later at 60 watts. The return to full power happened May 5 after $45,000 in repairs.

Funding reductions to Fayetteville State from 2009 onward caused WFSS to lose money. Even with the presence of Fort Bragg, the Fayetteville area was just barely large enough to support a standalone NPR member station. By 2014, all efforts to increase community support had come up short of the levels needed for the station to stay independent. On May 13, 2015, Fayetteville State trustees unanimously voted to sell WFSS to UNC Chapel Hill for $1.35 million. The deal was intended to preserve public radio in the region. Though the sale still required Federal Communications Commission approval, WUNC's licensee, WUNC Public Radio, LLC, took over WFSS' operations under a local management agreement. This allowed WFSS to begin simulcasting WUNC at 10 a.m. on May 13, hours after the trustee vote. Until the FCC approved the deal, Fayetteville State was required to keep an FCC-minimum skeleton crew of two employees (one manager and  engineer) on site. The sale was consummated on November 24, 2015.

WFSS-FM Inaugural Administration and Staff (1976 – 1977)
University Chancellor Dr. Charles Lyons, 
Department Head English and Communications: Dr. Elaine Newsome,
Director of Communications Center Mr. Joseph Ross, 
Chief Engineer Mr. Robert Collins, 
Communications Center Secretary Annie Hasan,
Station Advisor Mrs. Elizabeth Czech (Shaw University),

WFSS-FM Inaugural Student Staff (1976 – 1977)
Station Manager Louis F. McIntyre,
Program Director Donna Reavis (Donna Reavis-Graham),
Engineer George I. Addison, III,
Traffic and Continuity Denise Townsend,
Production Director Jeff Capel,
Music Director Stacey Burrs,
Though their names are not mentioned, many other students and university faculty and staff contributed to the establishment of the station by working as DJ's and support staff.

References

External links
 official website
 Last version of WFSS Website before sale to WUNC
 
 The Fayettevillian – 1978 WFSS Yearbook Highlights https://lib.digitalnc.org/record/28736?ln=en#?c=0&m=0&s=0&cv=131&r=0&xywh=855%2C1048%2C2064%2C798
 Mr. Joseph Ross - Former Student Station Manager Shaw University WSHA 88.9-FM (1969) https://archive.org/details/bear1969shaw/page/50

FSS
NPR member stations
University of North Carolina at Chapel Hill